South Hill is a mountain in Sullivan County, New York. It is located southeast of Grahamsville. Thunder Hill is located west-northwest and Sugarloaf Mountain is located north-northeast of South Hill.

References

Mountains of Sullivan County, New York
Mountains of New York (state)